Brixton is a village, parish and former manor situated near Plymouth in Devon, England. Its population is 1207.

It has views of the River Yealm. The church is 15th century, with a tower arch 200 years older.

Historic estates
The parish contains various historic estates including:
Spridleston, formerly a seat of a junior branch of the Fortescue family of Whympston, Modbury.
Hareston, formerly the seat of the Wood family.

References

External sources
Brixton at GENUKI
Pictures of Brixton

 

Civil parishes in South Hams
Villages in South Hams